The Universal Media Disc (UMD) is a discontinued optical disc medium developed by Sony for use on its PlayStation Portable handheld gaming and multimedia platform. It can hold up to 1.8 gigabytes of data and is capable of storing video games, feature-length films, and music. UMD was the trademark of Sony Computer Entertainment for their optical disk cartridge (ODC).

Video storage format
While the primary application for UMD discs is as a storage medium for PSP games, the format is also used for the storage of motion pictures and, to a lesser degree, television shows for playback on the PSP. The video is encoded in the H.264/MPEG-4 AVC format, with the audio in ATRAC3plus or PCM. Video stored on UMD is typically encoded in 720×480 resolution, but is scaled down when displayed on the PSP.
 
The American punk rock band The Offspring released their Complete Music Video Collection on the format. The BBC released a number of its programmes on UMD in the UK, including The Office, The Mighty Boosh, Doctor Who and Little Britain. WWE also released some wrestler highlights and documentary content on UMD format, such as The Monday Night Wars, Jake "the Snake" Roberts: Pick Your Poison, and WWE Raw Homecoming (a special episode of WWE Raw celebrating the return to USA Network); the only WWE pay-per-view released on UMD format was WrestleMania XXIV.

Tupac's performance, Live at the House of Blues, was also released on the UMD, which also included several music videos, including Hit 'Em Up.

Some adult films have been released on UMD in Japan.

Specifications
ECMA-365: Data Interchange on 60 mm Read-Only ODC – Capacity: 1.8 GB (UMD)
 Dimensions: approx. 64 mm (diameter) × 4.2 mm (thickness)
 Maximum capacity: 1.80 GB (dual layer), 900 MB (single-layer)
 Laser wavelength: 660 nm (red laser)
 Numerical aperture: 0.64
 Track pitch: 0.70 μm
 Minimum pit length: 0.1384 μm
 Modulation: 8-to-16 RLL(2,10)
 Encryption: AES 128-bit

The case dimensions for UMD discs are 177×104×14mm.

Provisions
According to the official ECMA specification Sony designed the UMD to support two possible future enhancements and products.

Protective Shutter: Similar to the MiniDisc and 3-inch floppy disk, this protective shutter would shield the inner disc from accidental contact.
Auto-Loading: UMDs were designed for possible future slot loading devices with Auto-Loading mechanisms. These would be very similar to the auto-loading mechanism used in slot loading MiniDisc home and car decks. It would also be similar to the Sony U-Matic auto-loading mechanism. Unlike the current clamshell loading design the PSP uses, a slot loading device using an Auto-Loading mechanism would be motorized and completely automatic. The user would insert the disc into the device slot, the motorized mechanism would then take over and draw the disc inside the drive completing the loading process. The disc would also be ejected fully automatically by the motorized mechanism, like a VCR. This would also mean that power would be required in order to insert or eject a disc.

Region coding
DVD region coding has been applied to most UMD movies and music. However, all PSP games are region-free.

Region  ALL: Worldwide (region-free)
Region 1: North America, Central America
Region 2: Europe (without Russia or Belarus), Japan, Middle East, South Africa, Greenland
Region 3: Southeast Asia, Taiwan, South Korea, Hong Kong
Region 4: Oceania, South America
Region 5: Russia, Ukraine, Belarus, India, Pakistan, Africa (without Egypt or South Africa), North Korea, Mongolia
Region 6: China

Availability and support

UMDs offer large capacity and the capability to store quality audio/video content; however, the format's proprietary nature and the lack of writers and blank media made adoption difficult. The UMD format never saw implementation on any device other than the PlayStation Portable, and as a result the market was very limited compared to those for other optical media formats. Buyers were generally put off by the high price of UMD releases, which often retailed at comparable prices to but lacked the extra content found on DVDs. Poor sales of UMD movies early in the format's life caused major studios like Universal and Paramount to rescind their support. Retail support of the format experienced similar troubles, and in 2006 Wal-Mart began phasing out shelf space devoted to UMD movies, with other chains soon following suit. By 2006 most non-specialty retail stores had stopped bringing in new UMD movies and no longer had a separate section devoted to them, with a few stray unsold titles mixed in among the regular PSP games.

In August 2007, Multimedia Recovery brought to the market their UMD Replacement Case after many complaints from PlayStation Portable owners that the outer casing of the UMD disc was cracking or pulling apart due to the poor design, which causes the UMD to become unreadable in the PlayStation Portable.

In late 2009, Sony began pushing developers away from the UMD format and towards digital distribution on the PlayStation Network in preparation for the launch of the digital-download-only PSP Go, which was the first (and only) PSP model to not include a UMD drive. However the system experienced lackluster sales compared to previous models, with most consumers still choosing the UMD-compatible PSP-3000 model, which continued to be sold alongside the PSP Go. Despite the earlier push for PlayStation Network releases around the PSP Go's launch, over half of the PSP's library was only ever available in UMD format including Crisis Core: Final Fantasy VII and Kingdom Hearts Birth by Sleep, though there have been a few PlayStation Network–only releases since the PSP Go's launch, such as LocoRoco Midnight Carnival. Still, most new games continued to be distributed via UMD, and, aside from those published by SCE, not all have been released on PlayStation Network. In 2011, the PSP-E1000, a budget PSP model with a UMD slot but without Wi-Fi (and thus no internet connectivity), was released, and is the final revision of the PlayStation Portable.

Since 2011, there have been no more movies released on UMD.

The successor of the PlayStation Portable, the PlayStation Vita, dropped UMD support entirely in a move similar to the PSP Go, focusing instead on digital downloads and opting for low-profile flash-based media for its retail software. The year 2014 marked the discontinuation of the PlayStation Portable, which rendered UMDs no longer available.

Third-party tooling 
UMD can be dumped into normal disc image files (.iso or .cso), using a cracked PSP for the optical drive. This file can be loaded by a cracked PSP or PS Vita from a MemoryStick, using a hacked version of the game download functionality.

See also
 List of optical disc manufacturers
 MiniDisc—a similar Sony format

References

External links

 Sony PSP Movie Sales Strong Article on the early success of movie sales on UMD from MP3 Newswire
 Breaking news: Sony's UMDs aren't selling well News story about the disappointing UMD sales.
 UMD Movie Database
 Partial archive of film releases on UMD

Audiovisual introductions in 2004
Audio storage
Discontinued media formats
Ecma standards
Japanese inventions
PlayStation Portable
Products and services discontinued in 2016
Video game distribution
Video storage